The Suzuki Dzire (stylized as the Suzuki DZire, previously known as Suzuki Swift Dzire but still sold as Suzuki Swift Sedan in Colombia and Guatemala) is a subcompact notchback sedan made by Suzuki mainly for the Indian market since 2008. It was developed as a sedan variation of the Swift hatchback.

The Dzire was launched in 2008 and was based on the first generation Swift hatchback. It was introduced as a subcompact sedan for the Indian market in order to offer a sedan-like car in a smaller size. Later, in order to get the tax benefits offered to cars with a length below 4 meters in India, it was converted into a sub-4-meter sedan.



First generation (2008) 

The Swift Dzire was introduced with a 1.3 L petrol engine and a Fiat-sourced 1.3 L diesel engine. Due to the BS IV emission norms in 2010, Maruti replaced the petrol engine with a 1.2 L K-series engine.

This generation was discontinued in 2012 for general buyers but continued to be produced until 2016 for fleet operators as the Swift Dzire Tour.

Powertrain

Second generation (2012) 

The second generation Swift Dzire was based on the second generation Swift hatchback. This update was a very significant one as its length was reduced below four meters in order to get the tax benefit offered to sub-4-meter cars.  A 1.2 L K-series petrol engine was introduced, and a 1.3 L DDiS turbo-diesel engine. A four-speed automatic transmission option was only available in the VXi trim.

The 2015 revised Swift Dzire was rated as the most fuel efficient diesel car in India.

Maruti Suzuki launched the DZire ZDi with Automatic Gear Shift (AGS) in January 2016. The 5-speed automated manual transmission (AMT) is paired to the 1.3 L DDiS turbodiesel engine.

The second generation Dzire is still available in India for fleet operators as the Dzire Tour S. Initially the 1.3 L turbodiesel engine was also available, but then dropped in April 2020 due the implementation of BS6 emissions standard. Currently only 1.2 L petrol and CNG engine are available, paired with a 5-speed manual transmission.

Powertrain

Third generation (2017) 

Maruti Suzuki launched the third generation Dzire sedan in India on 16 May 2017. The third generation is based on the third generation of the Suzuki Swift. However, for the first time ever, it drops the "Swift" nameplate from its name (except in Colombia and Guatemala where it is marketed as Swift Sedan). The second-generation Dzire continued to be produced and sold exclusively to fleet operators in India, while being rebadged as the Dzire Tour S.

It is built on the HEARTECT platform which uses ultra-high tensile and high tensile steel in its construction, so as to not comprise on structural rigidity. Despite being lighter, Suzuki claims that the vehicle is compliant with frontal and side impact regulations, as well as meets pedestrian safety regulations. The car is also wider and offers increased space for the occupant. Suzuki also claims that the third generation Dzire has 55 mm better rear legroom, as compared to the previous model.

It has a completely revised external body design with a special focus on the front section. It has a newly designed large hexagonal grille in the front section flanked by an all-new projector headlamps and a strip of LED DRLs running on the cluster. The body loses its overly bulgy nature and looks cleaner than before.

Both engines can be had with a 5-speed manual or 5-speed AMT.

Facelifted model appeared in March 2020. It comes with redesigned front end with wider grille and modern wood finish interiors, plus new features such as cruise control and VSC (AMT only). For the Indian market, a more refined 1.2 L K12N Dualjet petrol engine was used, replacing the previous petrol and diesel engines. The CNG variant of K12N engine was launched for Indian market in March 2022.

Powertrain

Sales 
Maruti Suzuki Dzire has been leading the subcompact segment in India ever since its second generation was introduced. Back in 2015, the company added another feature to its hat by crossing the sales mark of  1 million (10 lakh) sold units in the domestic market. The car has been grossing up a sales number of over 15,000 and close to 20,000 in the 2016–17 period where it has registered more than double the sales number of its competitors like the Honda Amaze, Hyundai Xcent and Tata Zest.

Reception 

In 2015, the Suzuki Dzire won J.D. Power's Most Appealing Entry Mid-size Car and the Most Dependable Mid-size Car.

References 

Dzire
Cars introduced in 2008
2010s cars
2020s cars
Subcompact cars
Dzire
Sedans
Cars of India